Republic of Malawi –  sovereign country located in southeastern Africa.  Malawi is bordered by Zambia to the northwest, Tanzania to the north and Mozambique, which surrounds it on the east, south and west and is separated from Malawi by Lake Malawi (also Lake Nyasa). The origin of the name Malawi is unclear; it is either derived from that of southern tribes, or from the "glitter of the sun rising across the lake" (as seen in its flag). Malawi is a densely populated country with a democratically-elected, presidential system of government.

The following outline is provided as an overview of and topical guide to Malawi:

General reference 

 Pronunciation: ,  or 
 Common English country name:  Malawi
 Official English country name:  The Republic of Malawi
 Common endonym(s):  
 Official endonym(s):  
 Adjectival(s): Malawian
 Demonym(s):
 International rankings of Malawi
 ISO country codes:  MW, MWI, 454
 ISO region codes:  See ISO 3166-2:MW
 Internet country code top-level domain:  .mw

Geography of Malawi 

Geography of Malawi
 Malawi is: a landlocked country
 Location:
 Eastern Hemisphere and Southern Hemisphere
 Africa
 East Africa
 Southern Africa
 Time zone:  Central Africa Time (UTC+02)
 Extreme points of Malawi
 High:  Sapitwa (Mulanje Massif) 
 Low:  Shire River 
 Land boundaries:  2,881 km
 1,569 km
 837 km
 475 km
 Coastline:  none
 Population of Malawi:
19,129,952 (62nd)

 Area of Malawi:
 Atlas of Malawi

Environment of Malawi 

 Climate of Malawi
 Ecoregions in Malawi
 Protected areas of Malawi
 National parks of Malawi
 Wildlife of Malawi
 Fauna of Malawi
 Birds of Malawi
 Mammals of Malawi

Natural geographic features of Malawi 

 Glaciers of Malawi: none 
 Islands of Malawi
 Rivers of Malawi
 World Heritage Sites in Malawi

Regions of Malawi

Ecoregions of Malawi 

List of ecoregions in Malawi
 Ecoregions in Malawi

Administrative divisions of Malawi 

Administrative divisions of Malawi
 Regions of Malawi
 Districts of Malawi

Regions of Malawi 

Regions of Malawi

Districts of Malawi 

Districts of Malawi

Municipalities of Malawi 

Municipalities of Malawi
 Capital of Malawi: Capital of Malawi
 Cities of Malawi

Demography of Malawi 

Demographics of Malawi

Government and politics of Malawi 

Politics of Malawi
 Form of government:
 Capital of Malawi: Capital of Malawi
 Elections in Malawi
 Political parties in Malawi

Branches of the government of Malawi 

Government of Malawi

Executive branch of the government of Malawi 
 Head of state: President of Malawi,
 Head of government: Prime Minister of Malawi,
 Cabinet of Malawi

Legislative branch of the government of Malawi 

 National Assembly of Malawi (unicameral)

Judicial branch of the government of Malawi 

Court system of Malawi
 Supreme Court of Malawi
 Traditional Courts in Malawi

Foreign relations of Malawi 

Foreign relations of Malawi
 Diplomatic missions in Malawi
 Diplomatic missions of Malawi

International organization membership 
The Republic of Malawi is a member of:

African, Caribbean, and Pacific Group of States (ACP)
African Development Bank Group (AfDB)
African Union/United Nations Hybrid operation in Darfur (UNAMID)
Common Market for Eastern and Southern Africa (COMESA)
Commonwealth of Nations
Food and Agriculture Organization (FAO)
Group of 77 (G77)
International Atomic Energy Agency (IAEA)
International Bank for Reconstruction and Development (IBRD)
International Civil Aviation Organization (ICAO)
International Criminal Court (ICCt)
International Criminal Police Organization (Interpol)
International Development Association (IDA)
International Federation of Red Cross and Red Crescent Societies (IFRCS)
International Finance Corporation (IFC)
International Fund for Agricultural Development (IFAD)
International Labour Organization (ILO)
International Maritime Organization (IMO)
International Monetary Fund (IMF)
International Olympic Committee (IOC)
International Organization for Standardization (ISO) (correspondent)
International Red Cross and Red Crescent Movement (ICRM)
International Telecommunication Union (ITU)

International Telecommunications Satellite Organization (ITSO)
International Trade Union Confederation (ITUC)
Multilateral Investment Guarantee Agency (MIGA)
Nonaligned Movement (NAM)
Organisation for the Prohibition of Chemical Weapons (OPCW)
Southern African Development Community (SADC)
United Nations (UN)
United Nations Conference on Trade and Development (UNCTAD)
United Nations Educational, Scientific, and Cultural Organization (UNESCO)
United Nations Industrial Development Organization (UNIDO)
United Nations Mission in Liberia (UNMIL)
United Nations Mission in the Sudan (UNMIS)
United Nations Organization Mission in the Democratic Republic of the Congo (MONUC)
Universal Postal Union (UPU)
World Confederation of Labour (WCL)
World Customs Organization (WCO)
World Federation of Trade Unions (WFTU)
World Health Organization (WHO)
World Intellectual Property Organization (WIPO)
World Meteorological Organization (WMO)
World Tourism Organization (UNWTO)
World Trade Organization (WTO)

Law and order in Malawi 

Law of Malawi

 Malawi Police Service
 Constitution of Malawi
 Human rights in Malawi
 LGBT rights in Malawi

Military of Malawi 

Military of Malawi
 Command
 Commander-in-chief:
 Forces
 Army of Malawi
 Air Force of Malawi

Local government in Malawi 

Local government in Malawi

History of Malawi 

History of Malawi

History by topic 
Archaeology of Malawi
History of rail transport in Malawi
History of the Jews in Malawi
Postage stamps and postal history of British Central Africa

Culture of Malawi 

Culture of Malawi
 Cuisine of Malawi
 Languages of Malawi
 Media in Malawi
 National symbols of Malawi
 Coat of arms of Malawi
 Flag of Malawi
 National anthem of Malawi
 Public holidays in Malawi
 Religion in Malawi
 Christianity in Malawi
 St Michael and All Angels Church, Blantyre, Malawi
 Hinduism in Malawi
 Islam in Malawi
 World Heritage Sites in Malawi

Art in Malawi 
 Music of Malawi

Sports in Malawi 

Sports in Malawi
 Football in Malawi
 Kamuzu Stadium
 Malawi at the Olympics

Economy and infrastructure of Malawi 

Economy of Malawi
 Economic rank, by nominal GDP (2007): 146th (one hundred and forty sixth)
 Agriculture in Malawi
 Banking in Malawi
 National Bank of Malawi
 Communications in Malawi
 Internet in Malawi
 Companies of Malawi
Currency of Malawi: Kwacha
ISO 4217: MWK
 Health care in Malawi
 Mining in Malawi
 Malawi Stock Exchange
 Tourism in Malawi
 Transport in Malawi
 Airports in Malawi
 Rail transport in Malawi

Education in Malawi 

Education in Malawi

Health in Malawi 

Health in Malawi

See also 

Malawi
List of international rankings
List of Malawi-related topics
Member state of the Commonwealth of Nations
Member state of the United Nations
Outline of Africa
Outline of geography

References

External links 

Government of the Republic of Malawi - Official site of the Malawi government

Directories
 
Malawi - Stanford University — African South of the Sahara directory category
Malawi - University of Pennsylvania — African Studies Center directory category

News
The Daily Times daily Blantyre-based newspaper
Nation Malawi daily Blantyre-based newspaper
Nyasa Times

Malawi